The 2021 Visit Tucson Sun Cup was the eleventh edition of the preseason exhibition soccer tournament among Major League Soccer (MLS) and United Soccer League (USL) teams. It was held between April 3 to April 10 in Tucson.

Teams 
The following clubs entered the tournament:

Major League Soccer
Colorado Rapids (sixth appearance)
LA Galaxy (second appearance)
Real Salt Lake (eighth appearance)
Sporting Kansas City (eighth appearance)

USL Championship
Phoenix Rising FC (fifth appearance)

Matches 
All times are Mountain Standard Time (UTC-07:00)
Schedule is subject to change.

Table standings

(C) - Cup Winner

Top scorers

References 

2021
2021 in American soccer
2021 in sports in Arizona
April 2021 sports events in the United States